The Lohner E was a reconnaissance flying boat built in Austria-Hungary during World War I. The "E" stood for Igo Etrich, one of the Lohner engineers. It was a conventional design for its day with biplane wings that featured slight sweepback, and an engine mounted pusher-fashion in the interplane gap. Its crew of two was seated in an open cockpit.

Around 40 examples were built before production shifted to the more powerful L.

Operators

Specifications

{{Aircraft specs
|ref='The Encyclopedia of World War I|prime units? = met
|crew=Two, pilot and observer
|length m=10.25
|length ft=33
|length in=8
|span m=16.20
|span ft=53
|span in=2
|height m=3.85
|height ft=12
|height in=8
|gross weight kg=1,700
|gross weight lb=3,747
|eng1 number=1
|eng1 name=Hiero 85hp
|eng1 kw=67
|eng1 hp=85
|max speed kmh=105
|max speed mph=65
|endurance=4 hours|ceiling m=4,000
|ceiling note=|ceiling ft=13,120
}}

See also

Notes

Bibliography

 Angelucci, Enzo. The Rand McNally Encyclopedia of Military Aircraft, 1914-1980. San Diego, California: The Military Press, 1983. .
 Taylor, Michael J. H. Jane's Encyclopedia of Aviation. London: Studio Editions, 1989. .
 Tucker, Spencer. The Encyclopedia of World War I''. Santa Barbara: ABC-Clio, 2005. . 

1910s Austro-Hungarian military reconnaissance aircraft
E
Flying boats
Biplanes
Single-engined pusher aircraft
Aircraft first flown in 1913

sr:Лонер TL